Paul Maurice Murphy (February 24, 1932 – January 22, 2020) was an American politician and judge from the state of Massachusetts.

Personal life
He was born in Brockton, Massachusetts, the son of Judge Maurice J. Murphy and Edith Saxton Murphy. He graduated from Williams College, where he played baseball, and Boston University School of Law. He was a second lieutenant in the U.S. Air Force.

Political career
He served in the Massachusetts House of Representatives from 1961 to 1974, representing the 11th Plymouth district from 1971 to 1974. He lost renomination in 1974.

Judicial career
He was appointed by President George H. W. Bush as an administrative law judge in the Social Security Administration, a position he held for 25 years.

Electoral history

1974 Massachusetts 12th Plymouth District State Representative Democratic Primary

1972 Massachusetts 11th Plymouth District State Representative General Election

1972 Massachusetts 11th Plymouth District State Representative Democratic Primary

1970 Massachusetts 11th Plymouth District State Representative General Election

References

1932 births
2020 deaths
Members of the Massachusetts House of Representatives
Williams College alumni
Williams Ephs baseball players
Boston University School of Law alumni
20th-century American politicians